Bhagavan Das (Devanagari: भगवान दास) (born Kermit Michael Riggs) is an American yogi who lived for six years in India, Nepal, and Sri Lanka. He is a bhakti yogi, kirtan singer, spiritual teacher and writer.

History
In 1963 at the age of 18, Kermit Riggs left California and journeyed solo through Europe, Northern Africa and the Middle East, eventually arriving in India. During the six years he spent as a wandering ascetic in India, Nepal and Sri Lanka, he writes that he received numerous initiations and teachings from various saints and sages. In 1965, Bhagavan Das met his guru, the Hindu holy man Neem Karoli Baba. He became a devotee of Neem Karoli Baba.

In 1967, Bhagavan Das guided spiritual teacher Ram Dass (known then as Richard Alpert) throughout India and introduced him to Neem Karoli Baba. Bhagavan Das appeared in Ram Dass' 1971 book Be Here Now, which described Bhagavan Das' role in Ram Dass' spiritual journeys in India.

Bhagavan Das is the author of the 1997 autobiography, It's Here Now (Are You?). In 2002, he released his seventh full album, called Now, that was produced and arranged by Mike D of the Beastie Boys, an East-meets-West musical pairing.

Personal life
In 1972 in California Bhagavan Das married his girlfriend, Bhavani, who was expecting their child; subsequently their daughter, Soma, was born in New York.  In 1974 in Berkeley, California, while still married to Bhavani, he met Usha. Bhagavan Das and Usha had a son, Mikyo, and a daughter, Lalita. Bhagavan Das' marriage to Bhavani ended with her death in 1983. He and Usha separated .

Bhagavan Das was married to Sharada Devi for 12 years.

In early 2019, Bhagavan Das and his current wife Amulya Maa began singing and teaching together. On October 1, 2020, they were married.

Works

Autobiography

Radio plays
The Fourth Tower of Inverness, 1972, Bhagavan Das's singing is the voice of the Bodhisattva Jukebox.
Moon Over Morocco, 1974, Bhagavan Das's singing is used in Sunny Skies' dream sequence.

Selected discography
AH, 1972
Now (produced by Mike D of the Beastie Boys), 2002
Holy Ghost Sessions (with Richard Sales), 2004
Golden Voice, 2007
Love Songs to the Dark Lord, 2009
The Howler at Dawn, 2009
Mother Light, 2014

Selected video appearances (self)
What is Yoga? (with David Life, Sharon Ganon, and Willem Dafoe), 1998
Ram Dass, Fierce Grace, 2001
Crazy Sexy Cancer, 2007Spiritual Revolution, 2008One Giant Leap 2: What About Me?, 2008Kumaré'', 2011

References

Notes

Citations

Works cited

Further reading

External links

Bhagavan Das & Amulya Maa's channel at YouTube

1945 births
Living people
American Hindus
Converts to Hinduism
Hindu yogis
Kirtan performers
Ram Dass